The Nożyk Synagogue is the only surviving prewar Jewish house of prayer in Warsaw, Poland. It was built in 1898-1902 and was restored after World War II. It is still operational and currently houses the Warsaw Jewish Commune, as well as other Jewish organizations.

History
Before World War II the Jewish community of Warsaw, one of the largest Jewish communities in the world at that time, had over 400 houses of prayer at its disposal. However, at the end of 19th century only two of them were separate structures, while the rest were smaller chapels attached to schools, hospitals or private homes.

The earliest Round Synagogue in the borough of Praga served the local community since 1839, while the Great Synagogue (erected in 1878) was built for the reformed community. Soon afterwards a need arose to build a temple also  for the orthodox Jewry.

The building was designed by a famous Warsaw architect, Karol Kozłowski, designer of the Warsaw Philharmonic Orchestra Hall. The façade is neo-romanticist, with notable neo-Byzantine elements. The building itself is rectangular, with the internal chamber divided into three aisles.

The synagogue was officially opened to the public on May 26, 1902. In 1914 the founders donated it to the Warsaw Jewish Commune, in exchange for yearly prayers in their intention. In 1923 the building was refurbished by Maurycy Grodzieński, who also designed a semi-circular choir that was attached to the eastern wall of the temple. In September 1939 the synagogue was damaged during an  air  raid. During World War II the area was part of the Small Ghetto and shared its fate during the Ghetto Uprising and then the liquidation of the Jewish community of Warsaw by the Nazis. After 1941 the Germans used the building as stables and a depot.

Restoration

After the war the demolished building was partially restored and returned to the Warsaw Jewish Commune, but the reconstruction did not start. It was completely rebuilt between 1977 and 1983 (officially opened April 18, 1983). It was also then that a new wing was added to the eastern wall, currently housing the seat of the commune, as well as several other Jewish organizations. Currently it is in use daily as both a place of worship as well as a place of gathering.

See also 
 Great Synagogue (Warsaw)
 Beit Warszawa Synagogue

Notes

External links 

 Nożyk Synagogue in Warsaw at Museum of the History of Polish Jews, Virtual Shtetl
 
 Photo gallery
 More pictures and a short description

Synagogues in Warsaw
Orthodox synagogues in Poland
Śródmieście, Warsaw
Synagogues completed in 1902
1902 establishments in Poland
Neoclassical architecture in Poland
Renaissance Revival synagogues
20th-century religious buildings and structures in Poland